Engal Aasan is a 2009 Indian Tamil-language action comedy drama film directed by R. K. Kalaimani. The film stars Vijayakanth in the lead role and Vikranth, Sheryl Brindo, Akshaya and Suja Varunee playing supporting roles. The film was released on 18 July 2009. The film, upon release could not release the big theatres and became a colossal flop.

Plot 

Mahendran, a bank officer who is transferred to the branch of Village Nilakottai to sort out the perplexing situation of bank fraud carried on by a big shot named Ramki. Over there, he happens to find out that Ramki has borrowed a loan of worth Rs.250 million in the name of villagers. Kumar and Muthu approach Ramki to return the money that he had illegally borrowed. When refused, he assures of arresting Ramki, and the very next day, Mahendran and his colleagues are pushed down in shock, for the entire bank is burnt down, and they are then dismissed. Now, Mahendran, together with his mates, tries to prove their innocence and reveal Ramki's true colors.

Cast 

 Vijayakanth as Mahendran
 Vikranth as Vasu
 Sheryl Brindo as Jayanthi
 Akshaya as Viji
 Suja Varunee as Usha
 Senthil as 'Aanikkaal' Ramasamy
 Ganja Karuppu as Yogiyan
 Sriman as Kumar
 Ilavarasu as Muthu
 Marthandan as Ramki
 Vasu Vikram as Pachatani Narayanan
 Aarthi as Jakkamma
 Balu Anand
 Madhan Bob
 Mayilsamy
 Singamuthu
 Mahanadi Shankar

Soundtrack
The music was composed by Sabesh–Murali.

Reception
thiraipadam wrote "the old-fashioned, simplistic storyline, the poor production values and the weak comedy track ensure that the movie doesn't offer anything else to a viewer not belonging to that group".

References

2009 films
2000s Tamil-language films
2000s action comedy-drama films
Indian action comedy-drama films
2000s masala films
Films directed by R. K. Kalaimani